Jiang Fan (18 March 1990, in Binzhou) is a Chinese track cyclist. At the 2012 Summer Olympics, she competed in the Women's team pursuit for the Chinese national team.

Achievements
  2011-2012 Track Cycling World Cup in Astana - Team pursuit

References

Chinese female cyclists
Living people
Olympic cyclists of China
Cyclists at the 2012 Summer Olympics
Chinese track cyclists
Asian Games medalists in cycling
Cyclists at the 2010 Asian Games
Medalists at the 2010 Asian Games
Asian Games gold medalists for China
Asian Games silver medalists for China

1990 births
People from Binzhou
21st-century Chinese women